Ishan Debnath (born 7 June 1991) is an Indian footballer who plays as a goalkeeper.

Career
Born in West Bengal, Debnath joined Tata FA in 2007 and got graduated in 2010.

Mumbai

2011-12
The 2011-12 football year got off to a good start for Ishan as he made his debut for Mumbai F.C. in the 2011 Indian Federation Cup against Salgaocar. He then made his I-League debut for Mumbai in Mumbai's 4-0 loss to Dempo S.C. on 28 October 2011.

Prayag United
Debnath signed for Prayag on 3 June 2012.

Career statistics

Club

Apps – Appearances; G.C. – Goals conceded; C.S. – Clean sheets.

References

External links 
 Goal Profile
 I-League Profile

Indian footballers
1991 births
Living people
People from North 24 Parganas district
Footballers from West Bengal
I-League players
Mumbai FC players
United SC players
Association football goalkeepers